The 2022 Grand Prix de Wallonie was the 62nd edition of the Grand Prix de Wallonie road cycling one day race, which was held on 14 September 2022 as part of the 2022 UCI ProSeries calendar.

Teams 
Eight of the 19 UCI WorldTeams, seven UCI ProTeams, and five UCI Continental teams made up the twenty teams that participated in the race. In total, 137 riders started the race, of which 133 finished.

UCI WorldTeams

 
 
 
 
 
 
 
 

UCI ProTeams

 
 
 
 
 
 
 

UCI Continental Teams

Result

References

External links 
 

Grand Prix de Wallonie
Grand Prix de Wallonie
Grand Prix de Wallonie
Grand Prix de Wallonie